Jeffersontown High School is a public high school in the Jefferson County public schools district in Kentucky. The school is a Career Magnet Academy with strong ties to numerous business/education partnerships within the region including the city of Jeffersontown and the Bluegrass Industrial Park community.  The current principal is Jarred Durham.

Demographics

Notable alumni

References

External links
 
 Jefferson County Public Schools

Jefferson County Public Schools (Kentucky)
Public high schools in Kentucky
Jeffersontown, Kentucky
High schools in Louisville, Kentucky